Michael Collins was an Irish Labour Party politician who served as Lord Mayor of Dublin from 1977 to 1978. He stood unsuccessfully as a Labour Party candidate for Dáil Éireann at the 1973, 1977 and 1981 general elections.

References

 

Year of birth missing (living people)
Living people
Lord Mayors of Dublin
Labour Party (Ireland) politicians